General elections were held in Chile on 21 November 2021, including presidential, parliamentary and regional elections. Voters went to the polls to elect the President of the Republic to serve a four-year term, 27 of 50 members of the Senate to serve an eight-year term in the National Congress, all 155 members of the Chamber of Deputies to serve a four-year term in the National Congress, and all 302 members of the regional boards to serve a three-year term. Following an electoral reform in 2015, the Senate increased its membership from 38 to 43 in 2017 and grew to its full size of 50 seats after this election.  This election cycle was characterized as being the most polarized in modern Chilean history and a departure from political normality in Chile, being held against the backdrop of the 2019 protests, the writing of a new constitution, and the global COVID-19 pandemic.

Continuing from the results of the elections that took place on 15 and 16 May 2021 for the positions of mayors, governors and members of the Constitutional Convention, the dominant center-left and center-right coalitions that had ruled the country since the end of the military dictatorship experienced a significant drop in support,  particularly in the presidential election.

For the parliamentary election, the center-right coalition Chile Podemos Más kept its position as the largest bloc in both chambers and even increased their number of senators, despite losing more than 10 percentage points from the previous election. In the left wing, the new coalition Apruebo Dignidad had important gains at the expense of the center-left New Social Pact (NPS), becoming the second largest bloc in the Chamber of Deputies. However, NPS kept more seats in the Senate. New parties, such as the far-right Republican Party and the populist Party of the People, also gained several seats. Consequently, the newly elected Congress was split evenly between the combined left and right, with the non-aligned congresspeople holding the balance of power.

Seven candidates ran for the presidency. The candidates for the traditional centrist coalitions finished in fourth and fifth place, while two candidates from newly formed parties and coalitions, José Antonio Kast and Gabriel Boric, qualified for the second round after no candidate received more than 50% of the vote. Before the 2021 Presidential election, Chile's political system had repeatedly bounced between centre-right and centre-left control, with little structural movement occurring between presidents. Voters in this election desired change and thus chose to reject the traditional political parties and move candidates of new parties forward. José Antonio Kast, of the far-right Republican Party, ran a campaign on populist and Christian conservative values with a strong "law and order" message, drawing comparisons with former US president Donald Trump and Brazilian president Jair Bolsonaro. In stark contrast, Gabriel Boric, a member of the Social Convergence party and the candidate of the left-wing  coalition, campaigned on a progressive message reflecting the ideas behind the 2019 protests. He pushed for broadening the social safety net, higher taxes on the wealthy, combating climate change, social justice, and change to the current privatized pension system. Boric also supported the ongoing writing of a new Chilean constitution, while Kast repeatedly said he would interfere to stop its ratification if elected.

Despite narrowly trailing behind Kast in the first round, Gabriel Boric emerged as the winner of the second round with 55.87% of the vote. This margin was larger than what was predicted by pre-election polls. Kast conceded defeat shortly after the polls closed. At the age of 35, Gabriel Boric became the youngest president ever elected in Chile and also set a record for receiving the highest number of votes in Chilean history. The turnout in the second round increased to 55.7%, which was the highest since voting became voluntary in Chile in 2013. On 11 March 2022 all the newly elected authorities, including president-elect Boric, took office.

Electoral system

The President is elected using the two-round system; if no candidate receives a majority of the vote in the first round, a second round will be held.

In the National Congress, the 155 members of the Chamber of Deputies are elected from 28 multi-member constituencies with between three and eight seats by open list proportional representation. Seats are allocated by the d'Hondt method. The 50 members of the Senate are elected for eight-year terms, with around half of the Senators renewed at each general election. Senators are elected from 16 multi-member constituencies of between two and five seats based on the regions. The 2021 elections will see 27 members elected, representing the regions of Antofagasta, Biobío, Coquimbo, O'Higgins, Los Lagos, Los Ríos, Magallanes and Santiago Metropolitan Region.

Presidential candidates

Summary of candidates
Below is the list of candidacies for president accepted by the Electoral Service on 27 August 2021. Boric's and Sichel's candidacies were automatically accepted after they were proclaimed the winner of their respective primaries by the Election Court.

Apruebo Dignidad

The  coalition decided its presidential candidate in the publicly-funded primaries held nationwide on 18 July 2021, won by lawmaker Gabriel Boric with 60% of the vote.

On 17 March 2021, Boric's party, Social Convergence, proclaimed him as its presidential candidate. The Commons Party's leadership also announced on 17 March 2021 that it would propose Boric as its presidential candidate in a meeting of the party's leadership the following Saturday. On 23 March 2021, Democratic Revolution, the coalition's largest party, proclaimed Boric as its presidential candidate. On 29 May 2021, the Common Force movement gave its support to Boric, after he beat Marcelo Díaz in a plebiscite held on May 27–28. On 17 August 2021, the Acción Humanista movement proclaimed him as its candidate.

Defeated in primary

Daniel Jadue (PC): Jadue is the mayor of Recoleta and a member of the Communist Party of Chile. He studied sociology at the University of Chile, and also studied total quality management at the Catholic University of the North. He appeared as the candidate with the most support in several opinion polls.

Dropped out

Marcelo Díaz (Unir): In November 2020 the Unir Movement presented the deputy and former spokesman as pre-candidate. On 18 May 2021 he dropped out of the race and lent his support to Boric.
Jaime Mulet (FRVS): The current president of the FRVS and deputy was proclaimed as his party's presidential candidate in September 2020. In May 2021, he received the support of the Christian Left movement. On 8 July 2021, the FRVS chose to support the candidacy of Daniel Jadue.

Chile Podemos Más

The  center-right coalition (previously ) participated in the publicly-funded primaries held nationwide on 18 July 2021. Former minister Sebastián Sichel beat the other three candidates by 49% of the vote.

Sichel was minister of Social Development and president of BancoEstado during the second administration of President Sebastián Piñera. He participated as an independent candidate in the  primary, supported by former PDC supporters and other centrist political movements.

Defeated in primary

Ignacio Briones (Evópoli): Briones is a university professor and economist who served as minister of Finance between 2019 and 2021. He was unanimously proclaimed by the Political Evolution party as their presidential candidate on 30 January 2021. He describes himself as a social liberal and seeks to promote liberal policies, although he is against abortion.
Mario Desbordes (RN): Desbordes became minister of Defense in July 2020. Before that, he was a member of the Chamber of Deputies. He was also president of his party between 2018 and 2020 and secretary-general between 2010 and 2018. During the first administration of President Sebastián Piñera, he had a stint as undersecretary of Investigations. He was proclaimed by the PRI party as their candidate on 29 December 2020. On 23 January 2021 his own party, RN, chose him as their contender for the  primary race after winning nearly 73% of the vote of the General Council.
Joaquín Lavín (UDI): Lavín studied economics at the University of Chicago. He was a presidential candidate in the 1999 and 2005 elections. He was also an economic appraiser of the neoliberal policies of Chile's military dictatorship. As mayor of Las Condes he actively promoted social housing programs for the poor and social integration with the rest of the cities, as well as enlarged use of technology in law enforcement and moderate social policies. He appeared as the candidate with the most support in most opinion polls.

Did not run

Evelyn Matthei (UDI): Matthei is a right-wing politician. She studied at the Pontifical Catholic University of Chile. In 1993 she was the target of a scheme by Sebastián Piñera to prevent her from becoming a candidate for the presidency that year. She was a senator and candidate in Chile's presidential elections in 2013, losing to Michelle Bachelet, the Socialist candidate. She dropped out of the race on 17 May 2021, a day after being re-elected as mayor of Providencia.

New Social Pact

The New Social Pact center-left coalition (formerly Constituent Unity) held a primary on 21 August 2021, which was won by Christian Democrat Senator Yasna Provoste by over 60% of the vote, with a turnout of around 150,000. They failed to reach an agreement to participate in the national publicly-funded primaries held on 18 July 2021. Both Paula Narváez and Carlos Maldonado —the other primary candidates— had urged the need for a primary to define a sole coalition candidate. Provoste said on 30 May 2021 that she is available to compete if her party deems it necessary. On 23 July 2021 she officially launched her candidacy during a ceremony in her native city of Vallenar, in northern Chile. She was proclaimed by the Christian Democratic Party as its candidate on 17 August 2021.

Defeated in primary 
Carlos Maldonado (PR): The former minister of Justice and current president of the Radical Party was proclaimed as presidential candidate on 23 December 2020. On 20 May 2021 he announced he would go straight to the November election. On July 3, 2021, he backtracked on his decision and declared himself available to compete in a possible coalition primary.
Paula Narváez (PS): The former minister was proclaimed by the Socialist Party's Central Committee as its presidential candidate on 28 January 2021 in a unanimous vote. Her candidacy emerged after a December 2020 Change.org petition made by female members of the PS asking Narváez to become the party's candidate was signed by former president Michelle Bachelet. In January 2021 both senator José Miguel Insulza and PS president Álvaro Elizalde dropped out of the race. On 5 June 2021 the PPD officially proclaimed her as its candidate.

Dropped out

Heraldo Muñoz (PPD): The current president of the PPD and former minister of Foreign Affairs became the PPD candidate after beating former minister of Interior and spokesperson Francisco Vidal and former deputy for District 39 and ambassador Jorge Tarud by 54% of the vote in a primary held on 31 January 2021. On 19 May 2021 he dropped out of the race and lent his support to Narváez.
Ximena Rincón (PDC): The current senator was proclaimed as the Christian Democratic Party's candidate for president after she beat former mayor and minister Alberto Undurraga in a primary held on 24 January 2021. She won by 57% of the vote. She officially dropped out of the race on 2 June 2021.
Pablo Vidal (independent politician): The deputy quit the Democratic Revolution party in December 2020 and founded the New Deal political platform. On 13 April 2021, he was proclaimed as presidential candidate by the Liberal Party and New Deal. On 19 May 2021 he dropped out of the race and lent his support to Narváez.

Christian Social Front

Then, on 6 August 2021, the Christian Conservative Party together with the Republican Party and other independents registered with the Chilean Electoral Service the pact Christian Social Front for the parliamentary elections of November. Kast officially registered his candidacy before the Electoral Service on 19 August 2021.

Other candidates 

Eduardo Artés (UP): The current president of the UP was confirmed by his party as its presidential candidate in June 2021.
Marco Enríquez-Ominami (PRO): In February 2021, his party asked the three-time presidential candidate to be once again their contender for the November 2021 election. On 23 July PRO's president, Camilo Lagos, said they would either participate in a primary or present a candidate directly to the November election. If their preferred choice, Enríquez-Ominami, was unable to run due legal restrictions, he stated that they would support senator Alejandro Guillier as their candidate. On 26 July 2021 the PRO declared they would not participate in the Constituent Unity primary to take place on 21 August 2021. On 4 September 2021 a regional electoral tribunal (TER) ordered his name to be removed from the electoral roll, thus disqualifying him from seeking office. However, he appealed successfully to the Election Certification Board (Tricel).
Franco Parisi (PDG): Parisi is an economist who ran for president in 2013, gaining 10% of the vote. He registered his candidacy for president on 23 August 2021.

Rejected 
Diego Ancalao (independent): Ancalao is a Mapuche activist. He was proclaimed on 20 August 2021 by the List of the People, a leftist movement, after he garnered more endorsements from independent electors at the Electoral Service's online platform than the other two candidates in competition, Soledad Mella and Ingrid Conejeros, between 12 and 19 August 2021. The Electoral Service, though, rejected his candidacy on 26 August 2021 on the grounds he did not provide the required minimum number of endorsements from independent electors.
Gino Lorenzini (independent): Lorenzini is an economist and entrepreneur. He registered his candidacy for president on 23 August 2021, presenting over 42 thousand endorsements from independent electors, more than the minimum required by law. However, the Electoral Service rejected his candidacy on 26 August 2021 because the law requires independent candidates to hold their status as independent for up to a year before the election, and he was part of the Party of the People during some of that time.

Declined to be candidates
Pamela Jiles (PH): Jiles is a journalist, television personality and leftist politician. She pursues her political career as deputy for District 12 in the Santiago Metropolitan Region. She comes from a family of communists and has praised Fidel Castro. She appeared as a potential presidential candidate with the most support in just one opinion poll. After her partner lost the Santiago governor race in May 2021, she withdrew her name from consideration.
Izkia Siches (independent): Siches is a physician who has served as president of the Chilean Medical College since 2017. A self-described feminist and past member of the Communist Youth, Siches became nationally known during the COVID-19 pandemic for her criticisms of the government's handling of public health measures. Her high approval ratings during the pandemic led to speculation she would run for president, but she ultimately declined.
René Rubeska (PNC): In June 2021, the National Citizen Party had announced its intention to bring its president René Rubeska as presidential candidate. However, the party was unable to gather the necessary signatures to register his candidacy.

Debates

Endorsements
After the first round, candidates Sichel and Parisi endorsed Kast.

Boric was endorsed by Enríquez-Ominami and Provoste. Former President Michelle Bachelet returned to Chile from her role as UN Human Rights High Commissioner to formally endorse Boric.

On 9 December, parliamentarians and public figures from over 15 countries signed a statement endorsing Boric.

Opinion polls

First round
Results considering only official candidates (excluding "Other", "Don't know", "Do not vote", etc.) and general voters, excluding polls showing likely voters or non-national samples.

Second round 
Results considering only official candidates (excluding "Other", "Don't know", "Do not vote", etc.) and general voters, excluding polls only with likely voters. Average of polls every 3 days.

Public transport inefficiency
On the day of the second round on 19 December, voters at bus stops in rural parts of the country, and large municipalities in the Santiago Metropolitan Region, such as Puente Alto, San Bernardo, and Maipú, waited hours for public bus services in the blazing sun to reach their polling stations, due to a shortage of public bus services available on that day.

Soon after these reports came in, local authorities and citizens in these municipalities took to social media to show Red Metropolitana de Movilidad bus terminals and parking decks full of unused city buses. This led to speculation that the incumbent government was suppressing voters by reducing bus services to prevent them from casting their votes. Apparently, most complaints of delays came from neighborhoods where Gabriel Boric had stronger levels of support.

Leading figures from Boric's campaign, such as Izkia Siches cried foul, accusing the government of trying to help Kast win the election. Boric said "the government has a responsibility" to solve the problem to allow voters to be ferried to vote with the unused buses. The elections authority Servel expressed similar concerns to Transport Minister Gloria Hutt.

The government spokesman Jaime Bellolio called the Boric campaign's claim as a "blatant lie", and denied that the government was suppressing voters, claiming that there were between 5,000 and 6,000 buses running in the Metropolitan Region. However, this was contradicted by transport authorities, which stated that only 3,000 buses were operating. The transport authority however, also stressed that the number of buses was 55 percent more than a usual Sunday and between 3 percent or 4 percent greater than on the first round of election in November.

A Transantiago bus driver claimed that only 40 percent of the bus drivers available were driving that day, despite statements from the government that they were operating buses on a normal work schedule. As a result, carpools were organized through social media, while private services like Uber and Cabify offered ride discounts for voters to travel to polling stations.

In the evening, just before polls closed, Transport Minister Gloria Hutt apologized, acknowledging the government was slow to react to the situation and blamed the delays on road work and traffic, but denied that the government was engaging in voter suppression.

Results

President
Turnout for the second round rose by 1.2 million from the first round, and from 47.3% in the first round to 55.6%, the highest level for any Chilean election since voting ceased to be compulsory in 2012.

Gabriel Boric won the election with 55.9% of the vote and is set to become the youngest president in Chile's history and youngest state leader in the world.

A post-election survey showed that despite their endorsement of Kast, 59% of Parisi's voters and 23% of Sichel's voters voted for Boric, while 82% of Yasna Provoste's supporters, 83% of Marco Enríquez-Ominami's supporters, and 92% of Eduardo Artés's supporters voted for Boric.

Chamber of Deputies

Senate

Regional Boards
Note: Provisional results, including 99.97% of ballot boxes.

Aftermath 

On 19 December 2021, shortly after the preliminary results of the second round were publicized, Kast conceded defeat and congratulated Boric through a tweet saying "I have just talked to Gabriel Boric and have congratulated him for his big triumph. From now on he is the president-elect of Chile and deserves all of our respect and constructive collaboration. Chile is always first". Later that day, Kast visited Boric at the latter's campaign headquarters in central Santiago. Boric thanked Kast during his victory speech, saying "we must build bridges for our compatriots to live better, because that is the people of Chile's demand".

Outgoing president Sebastián Piñera had a video call with president-elect Boric, which was broadcast live on TV and radio, complying with one of the country's electoral traditions since the transition to democracy. During their conversation, Piñera congratulated Boric and said "when we divide [our country] in wars between ourselves, things always go wrong. We all hope you make a very good government for Chile and the Chileans and I am sure you will do your best". Boric said "I am going to be the President of all Chileans, because I believe it is important to interpret everyone and agreements should be between all of the people and not inside four walls".

Boric was also congratulated by President of the Constitutional Convention, Elisa Loncón. The leader of Coordinadora Arauco-Malleco, dismissed Boric as being together with Kast "two faces of the same coin" and warned that Boric will maintain "the colonial-format capitalist system". Llaitul pledged to continue "the path of revolutionary autonomism".

International reaction
Among international leaders who congratulated Boric are President of Argentina Alberto Fernández, Vice President Cristina Kirchner, President of Bolivia Luis Arce, President of the Chamber of Senators of Bolivia Andrónico Rodríguez, former President of Brazil Lula da Silva, President of Colombia Iván Duque, President of Costa Rica Carlos Alvarado, President of Ecuador Guillermo Lasso, Prime Minister of Spain Pedro Sánchez, US Secretary of State Antony Blinken, Minister for Europe and Foreign Affairs of France Jean-Yves Le Drian, Mayor of Paris Anne Hidalgo, President of Mexico Andrés Manuel López Obrador and his Foreign Secretary Marcelo Ebrard, President of Peru Pedro Castillo, President of Uruguay Luis Lacalle Pou, President of Venezuela Nicolás Maduro, and opposition leaders of Venezuela Juan Guaidó and Henrique Capriles. The European Union, via its High Representative of the Union for Foreign Affairs and Security Policy Josep Borrell, also congratulated Boric on his victory in the second round and pointed to "strengthening" relations with the Chilean government.

President of Brazil Jair Bolsonaro had a late and cold reaction to Boric's election. He pointed out that "half of the population abstained" in the election, and referred to Boric as "that Boric". Boric responded to Bolsonaro's comments by stating that "clearly we are very different". Bolsonaro's son Eduardo, who had supported Kast, had a harsher reaction, stating that Chile was set on a path similar to Maduro's Venezuela with Boric. He mentioned the –8% drop that occurred in the Santiago Stock Exchange following the election and linked Boric to the violence that erupted in Chile in 2019.

President of the United States Joe Biden had a phone conversation with president-elect Boric on 30 December, on which Biden congratulated Boric for his victory. In a press statement published by the White House, Biden "applauded Chile's free and fair elections as a powerful example to the region and the world", and also underscored the cooperation between Chile and the U.S. to "promote a green and equitable recovery from the COVID-19 pandemic and to address the existential threat posed by climate change". Biden also sent through the president-elect his condolences for the death of 14-year old Valentina Orellana-Peralta, who was killed in a police shootout at Los Angeles, California on 23 December. Boric later posted on his Twitter account about the conversation he had with President Biden, stating that "In addition to the shared joy for our respective electoral victories, we talked about common challenges such as fair trade, climate crisis and strengthening democracy. We will continue to talk."

Parliamentary results 
Due to the low results in the parliamentary election, 12 political parties were dissolved by the Electoral Service: Christian Conservative Party (1 deputy), Citizens (1), Democratic Independent Regionalist Party (1), Equality Party, Green Ecological Party (2), Humanist Party (3), Progressive Party, National Citizen Party, New Time, Patriotic Union, Revolutionary Workers Party and United Centre (1). 9 deputies became independent politicians before joining the new Congress.

Notes

References

External links
 

Chile
General
General election
Presidential elections in Chile
Gabriel Boric
Presidency of Sebastián Piñera